Frederick Jacobus Marthinus 'Marco' Mason (born ) is a South African rugby union player for Santboiana in the División de Honor in Spain. His regular position is fullback.

References

South African rugby union players
Living people
1992 births
People from Mogalakwena Local Municipality
Rugby union fullbacks
Free State Cheetahs players
Sportspeople from Limpopo
Rugby union players from Limpopo